Garhi Daulatzai is a town and union council of Mardan District in Khyber Pakhtunkhwa province of Pakistan. It is located at 34°12'0N 72°10'0E and has an altitude of 294 metres (967 feet).

References

Union councils of Mardan District
Populated places in Mardan District